Pyrenee can refer to:
 Pyrénée, 1998 French comic book
 Pyrenees, mountains in France and Spain
 Great Pyrenees, breed of dog